Just Love (styled Just LOVE) is the sixth studio album by Japanese singer and songwriter Kana Nishino. It was released on July 13, 2016. It was number-one on the Oricon weekly Albums Chart on its release, with 126,234 copies sold. It was the second best-selling album in Japan in July 2016, with 201,980 copies sold. It was also number-one on the Billboard Japan Hot Albums chart and also on the Billboard Japan Top Album Sales chart.

Track listing

Charts

Weekly charts

Monthly charts

Year-end charts

Certification and sales

|-
! scope="row"| Japan (RIAJ)
| Platinum
| 305,538 
|-
! scope="row"| Japan (RIAJ)
| 
| 5,576+ 
|-
|}

References

Japanese-language albums
2016 albums
SME Records albums
Kana Nishino albums